Alexander Schalck-Golodkowski (3 July 1932 – 21 June 2015) was a politician and trader in the German Democratic Republic. He was director of a main department ('Hauptverwaltungsleiter') in the Ministry for Foreign Trade and German Domestic Trade (1956–62), the Deputy Minister for External Trade (1967–75), and head of the GDR's Kommerzielle Koordinierung (KoKo, 1966–86).

Early life

He was born in Berlin to a stateless ethnic Russian father and adopted by the Schalcks when he was eight years old. His biological father served as a Tsarist officer in World War I and became the head of the Wehrmacht's Russian language interpreter school in World War II; he did not return from Soviet captivity. His maternal grandfather worked for Stinnes in St. Petersburg.

Schalck-Golodkowsky joined the Free German Youth in 1951 and the Socialist Unity Party of Germany (Sozialistische Einheitspartei Deutschlands, SED) in 1955.

Career in East Germany

In 1966 he was appointed head of KoKo (at that time a newly formed department of the Ministry for Foreign Trade, ten years later it would formally become a powerful independent government agency in its own right) and in 1967 was also appointed a special officer of the Ministry of State Security.

In 1983 he led the negotiations with Bavarian leader Franz Josef Strauß to obtain a billion Deutschmarks loan from the West German government.

He was appointed to the central committee of the SED in 1986 and, under suspicion of misusing his powers at KoKo he fled to West Berlin in December 1989. He was briefly imprisoned before settling in Bavaria.

Post-reunification activities

Following reunification, the actions of KoKo and of Schalck-Golodkowski head were investigated on suspicions of espionage activities, tax evasion, fraud, breaking embargo regulations and offences against Allied military law. He was prosecuted in 1996 for breaking Allied law and sentenced to a year's probation; other charges were withdrawn due to his ill-health—he had operations to remove cancers in 1987 and 1997.

He had been married twice and had two children.

See also

Heinrich Rau

References

1932 births
2015 deaths
Politicians from Berlin
Socialist Unity Party of Germany politicians
East German civil servants
Stasi officers
Stasi officers convicted of crimes
German people convicted of tax crimes
German people of Russian descent
Recipients of the Patriotic Order of Merit